Vieux-Vy-sur-Couesnon (literally Vieux-Vy on Couesnon; ; Gallo: Vioez-Vic) is a commune in the Ille-et-Vilaine department in Brittany in northwestern France.

Geography

The neighboring communes are Romazy, Chauvigné, Saint-Christophe-de-Valains, Saint-Ouen-des-Alleux, Mézières-sur-Couesnon, Gahard, and Sens-de-Bretagne.

History
The name Vieux-Vy-sur-Couesnon probably comes from the Latin Vetus Victus, "old market town." The settlement has had this name since at least 1063.

Economy
Industries:
 Silver-lead ore was mined in the 19th century at a place called Brais. The mine was closed in 1956.
 A granite quarry is still in operation in the northeast, not far from the former mine site.

Population
Inhabitants of Vieux-Vy-sur-Couesnon are called Vieuxviciens in French.

Transportation
The village is served by just one bus route, the Rennes/Antrain line.

Sights
 The Saint-Germain church, most of which dates from the seventeenth century, although certain parts date from the eleventh century. The organ was installed in 1883.
 The Chateau of Moulinet, dating from the nineteenth century.
 The Grotto of Brais (dedicated to the Virgin Mary).
 Within the village boundaries there are seven watermills on the Couesnon river. These are mainly paper mills.
 The cyclopean Wall of Orange (from the Iron Age).
 A trough-shaped granite sarcophagus, first mentioned in 1020, located at the door to the church.

See also
Communes of the Ille-et-Vilaine department

References

External links

All these links are in French.
 Official website
 Présentation de la commune de Vieux-Vy-sur-Couesnon, Patrimoine Bretagne

Communes of Ille-et-Vilaine